The Lazar 3 is the latest version of the Lazar armored vehicle family of armed personnel carriers, designed for various applications and missions. It is designed and produced by Yugoimport SDPR.

History
On March 20, 2021, procurement contract worth 3.7 billion Serbian dinars for the Serbian Armed Forces was announced.

Design
Lazar 3 has a highly sophisticated, modular ballistic protection. The hull is made of armored steel and can be fitted with a spall liner. The applied ballistic protection can be tailored to the specific needs of the user and allows for application of additional state-of-the-art ballistic protection technologies throughout the vehicle service life. The vehicle floor has two levels of anti-mine protection.

The power train is accommodated in the front right-side of the vehicle in a protected space completely separated from the crew. The central transfer case transmits the torque to all wheels that have independent suspension and provide for the vehicle's high mobility. All the shafts provide power, while the first two steer the wheels.

The driver and commander are positioned in the front of the vehicle. They can use side doors for the entrance and exit. Above their seats are hatches, the driver's hatch having a three position lock: one position being designed for locking the cover while driving with the open hatch. The driver and the commander have each three periscopes available for their use in the vehicle. The driver's seat is ergonomic and adjustable in vertical and horizontal planes. The steering column is also adjustable by height and angle. The crew compartment is located in the rear of the vehicle and provides enough space for various missions. This part of the vehicle can be accessed through the rear ramp, through the two doors embedded in this ramp or through the big hatches on the vehicle roof. The ramp is hydraulic-operated by way of the power train. It can be activated both from the driver's compartment and the crew compartment.

The number of the crew depends on the type of a mission and the weapons used in the vehicle. When the vehicle is equipped with the remote control weapon station (RCWS), the vehicle should be manned with 12 troops (commander, driver, gunner + 9 soldiers), while the version with a turret would be manned with one soldier less.

Versions
Four versions of Lazar 3 are developed:

Armed with 12.7mm machine-gun RCWS
Armed with 20mm auto-cannon M-55 RCWS Kerber
Armed with 30mm automatic-gun 32V01 RCWS
Launcher of RALAS missiles
Ambulance

Gallery

Operators 

 : 
 Serbian Armed Forces – 30
 Serbian Gendarmery
 : 
 Armed Forces of Turkmenistan - 24 on order for Turkmen Ground Forces; equipped with Russian MB2-03 remote weapon station, consisting of the 2A42 automatic cannon, PKTM coaxial machine gun, AGS-17 AGL and Tucha smoking system with 6 grenades.

See more 
 BOV M16 Miloš
 Bumerang
 BTR-90
 FNSS Pars
 LAV-25
 Otokar Arma
 Patria AMV

References

External links
 YugoImport Site

Wheeled armoured personnel carriers
Armoured personnel carriers of Serbia
Armoured fighting vehicles
Eight-wheeled vehicles
Military vehicles introduced in the 2010s
Armoured personnel carriers of the post–Cold War period